Destination Unknown may refer to:

 Destination Unknown (1933 film), an American pre-Code drama film
 Destination Unknown (1942 film), an American film directed by Ray Taylor
Destination Unknown (novel), a 1954 novel by Agatha Christie
Destination Unknown, 2001 album by Mest
Destination Unknown (Ron Sexsmith album), 2005
 Destination Unknown (Vibe Tribe album), 2009
"Destination Unknown" (song), a 1982 song by Missing Persons
 "Destination Unknown", 2003 song by Crystal Waters and Alex Gaudino 
 "Destination Unknown," 1986 song by Electric Light Orchestra from 2007 re-release of the album Balance of Power
 "Destination Unknown," 1986 song by Marietta from the Top Gun soundtrack
 "Destination Unknown," 1984 song by Pseudo Echo from the album Autumnal Park